Toshiharu Kawada (born 16 December 1947) is a Japanese professional golfer.

Kawada played on the Japan Golf Tour, winning once.

Professional wins (1)

Japan Golf Tour wins (1)

External links

Japanese male golfers
Japan Golf Tour golfers
1947 births
Living people